Keilah, meaning Citadel, was a city in the lowlands of Judah. It is now a ruin, known as Kh.

History
The earliest historical record of Keilah is found in the Amarna letters, from the 14th-century BCE. In some of them is mentioned Keilah and her king Shuwardatha. It is possible to infer from them the importance of this city among the cities of Canaan that bordered near Egypt, before the conquest of Canaan by the Israelites.   

According to the biblical narrative in the first Book of Samuel, the Philistines had made an inroad eastward as far as Keilah, and had begun to appropriate the country for themselves by plundering its granaries, until David prevented them. Later, upon inquiry, he learnt that the inhabitants of the town, his native countrymen, would prove unfaithful to him, in that they would deliver him up to King Saul, at which time he and his 600 men "departed from Keilah, and went whithersoever they could go”. They fled to the woods in the wilderness of Ziph. "And David was in the wilderness of Ziph, in a wood". Here his friend Jonathan sought him out, "and strengthened his hand in God": this was the last meeting between David and Jonathan.

Keilah is mentioned in the Book of Joshua (15:44) as one of the cities of the Shephelah ("lowlands"). Benjamin of Tudela identified Kâkôn (Qaqun) as ancient Keilah in 1160. The site was earlier described by Eusebius in his Onomasticon as being "[nearly] eight milestones east of Eleutheropolis, on the road to Hebron." Victor Guérin, who visited Palestine between the years 1852–1888, also identified Keilah with the same ruin, Khirbet Kila, near the modern village by that name, a place situated a few kilometers south of Adullam (Khurbet esh Sheikh Madhkur) and west of Kharas. This view has been adopted by the Israel Antiquities Authority. The ruin, Khirbet Kila, lies on the north side of the village Kila. Guérin found here a subterranean and circular vault, apparently ancient; the vestiges of a wall surrounding the plateau, and on the side of a neighboring hill, tombs cut in the rock face. The town is mentioned in the Amarna tablets under the corruption Ḳilta.

Second Temple period
Keilah is mentioned in the Book of Nehemiah as one of the towns resettled by the Jewish exiles returning from the Babylonian captivity and who helped to construct the walls of Jerusalem during the reign of the Persian king Artaxerxes I (Xerxes). Nehemiah further records that those returnees were the very descendants of the people who had formerly resided in the town before their banishment from the country, who had all returned to live in their former places of residence.

During the Second Temple period, pressed figs shaped into hard round or square-shaped cakes (called develah) were produced in Keilah and because of their exceptionally good and succulent quality, as well as sweetness, were permitted to be offered as such in the Temple as First-fruits, a thing normally reserved only for fresh fruits (when brought from places near Jerusalem), and for raisins and dried figs when brought from distant places.

The town's present residents are Bedouins who were expelled during 1948 Arab–Israeli War from areas around Beer Sheba.

Description of ruin
Khirbet Qeila (Ruin of Keilah) is situated on a terraced, dome-shaped hill at the end of a spur that descends to the east, adjacent to a small Arab village which bears the same name. On the other side it is surrounded by channels, which descend into the watercourse of Wadi es-Sur (an extension of the Elah Valley) and fortify it with a natural fortification. Its area is about 50 dunams (12.3 acres). Remains of walls can be seen on its slopes, and in the north is seen the ascent to the city gate, which is made like unto a ramp with a retaining wall. At the foot of the tell, on the side of the road, burial caves were hewn. The pottery finds at the tell indicate that it had an almost continuous settlement from the Bronze Age to the Crusader and Mamluk periods.

The remnants of an old road leading from Keilah to the Elah Valley via Adullam can still be seen, and from Keilah to Tarqumiyah. Another ancient road breaks off from Keilah in the direction of Kefar Bish, now a ruin  to the west of Keilah, but once a Jewish village settled during the Roman occupation of Palestine.

References

Bibliography

External links
Survey of Western Palestine, Map 21:  IAA, Wikimedia commons

Amarna letters locations
Hebrew Bible cities
Biblical geography
Canaanite cities
Ancient Jewish settlements of Judaea
Ancient villages in Israel
Ancient Jewish history